In geometry, the augmented hexagonal prism is one of the Johnson solids. As the name suggests, it can be constructed by augmenting a hexagonal prism by attaching a square pyramid to one of its equatorial faces. When two or three such pyramids are attached, the result may be a parabiaugmented hexagonal prism, a metabiaugmented hexagonal prism, or a triaugmented hexagonal prism.

External links
 

Johnson solids